John T. Siomos (July 30, 1947 – January 16, 2004) was an American rock drummer who performed with Todd Rundgren, Mitch Ryder and the Detroit Wheels, Rick Derringer, Carly Simon, Mark "Moogy" Klingman, Buzzy Linhart and Frampton's Camel.

Born in Chicago, Illinois, United States, he died in Brooklyn, New York.

Early life 
John T. Siomos was born in Chicago son of Nick and Susie (née Kollias). He had a twin brother Steve. They were fraternal twins.

Career 
Siomos played on Peter Frampton's Frampton Comes Alive. Siomos, also known as John Headley-Down, co-wrote and performed on the songs "Doobie Wah", and the hit single "Do You Feel Like We Do" from that album. He also played drums on "Hello It's Me" and other songs on Todd Rundgren's gold album Something/Anything?.

Death 
Siomos died in Brooklyn of undisclosed causes on January 16, 2004.  He is buried in Elmwood Cemetery, River Grove, Illinois.

Performance credits

References

External links
 "John Siomos; drum work included 'Frampton Comes Alive' album", obituary article from: Chicago Sun-Times, Article date: January 23, 2004 Author: Brenda Warner Rotzoll
 Brief obituary on LifeinLegacy.com
 Memorials from fans posted on FindAGrave.com
 
 

Musicians from Chicago
1947 births
2004 deaths
20th-century American drummers
American male drummers
20th-century American male musicians